Rise is the fifth studio album by American singer Danny Gokey. It was released on January 13, 2017 through BMG Rights Management. His second full-length album of original material in the Contemporary Christian genre, Rise serves as the follow-up to Gokey's top 40 album, Hope in Front of Me (2014). The album's title track was released in August 2016 as the record's lead single.

Background
In January 2014, Gokey released his first Christian single, "Hope in Front of Me". That June, he released his second studio album, also titled Hope in Front of Me, which debuted at number one on the Billboard Christian Albums chart. Over the next two years, Gokey released two more albums – a Christmas collection, titled Christmas Is Here (2015), and a Spanish language re-recording of Hope in Front of Me, titled La Esperanza Frente a Mi (2016).

Following the release of Hope in Front of Me, Gokey began writing and recording new songs. Nine of the eleven songs on Rise were co-written by Gokey, drawing on his personal experiences. The album also features two collaborations – "Chasing", with fellow American Idol alumnus Jordin Sparks, and "Better Than I Found It", with gospel singer Kierra "Kiki" Sheard. Rise became available for pre-order on November 15, 2016.

Singles
The title track, "Rise", was released to digital retailers on August 11, 2016 as the album's first single. It officially impacted Christian radio on September 2, 2016. The song has reached a peak position of 5 on the Billboard Christian Songs chart.

"The Comeback" hit Christian radio on April 28, 2017 as the album's second single.
 
"Masterpiece" was released on April 17, 2018 as the album's third single.

“Masterpiece” debuts between the Top 20 and the Top 30 on the Billboard Christian AC Airplay Chart at #27 for 11 weeks starting on April 21, 2018.

"If You Ain't in It" was released on July 7, 2018 as the fourth and final single from the album.

Awards and accolades 
In 2017, Rise was nominated for a GMA Dove Award in the Pop/Contemporary Album of the Year category at the 48th Annual GMA Dove Awards. It was also nominated for at the 2018 Grammy Awards for Best Contemporary Christian Music Album.

Track listing

Charts

Release history

References

2017 albums
Danny Gokey albums